Clementine is a free and open-source audio player. It is a port of Amarok 1.4 to the Qt 4 framework and the GStreamer multimedia framework. It is available for Unix-like, Windows and macOS operating systems. Clementine is released under the terms of the GPL-3.0-or-later. 

Clementine was created due to the transition from version 1.4 to version 2 of Amarok, and the shift of focus connected with it, which was criticized by many users. The first version of Clementine was released in February 2010.

The last stable release of Clementine was in 2016, but development has since resumed on GitHub, with a number of release candidate versions published.

In 2018, a fork of Clementine named Strawberry Music Player was released.

Features 
Clementine has the ability to stream audio from services such as Spotify, SoundCloud and Last.fm, as well as other platforms. The software also has the functionality to display information such as lyrics and statistics regarding the song currently being played, as well as mimicking iTunes functionality by interacting with users’ iPod players

Some additional features supported by Clementine are:
 Tag editor, album cover and queue manager.
 Fetch missing tags from MusicBrainz.
 Project audio visualization.
 Search and download podcasts.
 Creation of smart and dynamic playlists.
 Tabbed playlists, import and export as M3U, XSPF, PLS, ASX and Cue sheets.
 Transcoding music into MP3, Ogg (Vorbis, Speex, Opus), FLAC, AAC or WMA.
 Playback of Windows Media Files in macOS (which iTunes and many other players cannot do).
 Remote control using an Android device, a Wii Remote, MPRIS or the command-line interface.
 Moodbar visualizations.
 Save statistics to file.

See also

References

External links 

 

2010 software
Applications using D-Bus
Audio player software that uses Qt
Free audio software
Free media players
Free software programmed in C++
Linux media players
macOS media players
Software that uses GStreamer
Windows multimedia software